Our Wives Under the Sea is a 2022 British horror novel by Julia Armfield. The novel was Armfield's debut novel.

Summary 
The novel tells the story of Miri, a grant writer, whose wife Leah has returned from a deep-sea research expedition that was marked by catastrophic failure and who is undergoing a physical metamorphosis as a result.

Themes 
Aida Edemariam noted themes of "transformation and return" in the novel, calling it "a kind of Orpheus story." Kirkus Reviews described one of the main questions of the novel as "What happens to a marriage when one spouse is no longer the person you married?"

In an interview with Sam Manzella of Them, Armfield said that the novel was in part inspired by a wish to explore the "crossover with queer women’s fiction and the sea," adding that the ocean is often used to symbolise both "something forbidden" and something that "can be many things at once." In an interview with Sam Franzini of Our Culture Mag, she stated that the novel was in part "about an anticipation of grief and losing someone," adding that part of the horror was from "the clanging bureaucracy of not being able to get an answer."

Reception 
Kayla Kumari Upadhyaya of Autostraddle reviewed it as "a simultaneously bleak and beautiful elegiac novel," adding that the prose of the novel was "grotesque and lovely all at once." Alycia Pirmohamed of The Big Issue reviewed the novel similarly, saying that the novel was "exquisitely grotesque, surreal, and elegiac in equal measure," adding that it excelled in the "space of creeping horror, of suspense, of bodily peculiarity." Emily Watkins of i said that the novel "deftly weaves a love story into creeping horror," adding that the novel sticks close to "what life is made of... mapping the grim monotony of existence, the undignified and the humdrum, as much as it does the mythical side of Leah’s story."

References 

2022 British novels
British horror novels
2020s horror novels
LGBT-related horror literature
2020s LGBT novels
British LGBT novels
2022 debut novels
Picador (imprint) books